Debra Allison Copening (née Mellot; July 4, 1964 – January 18, 2020) was a Democratic member of the Nevada Senate, representing Clark County District 6 (map) from 2009 to 13, defeating incumbent Bob Beers in 2008. She did not run for re-election in 2012.

Early life
Allison Copening was born in Las Vegas. She graduated from Bonanza High School in 1982, and also attended the University of Nevada, Las Vegas where she graduated with a B.A. in Communication Studies.

Her parents were Harold and Jane Mellot; Copening had one older brother, Michael and one older sister, Gina.

Career
Copening started her career in the field of broadcasting for nine years at the CBS affiliate in Las Vegas, KLAS TV.

Personal life
Copening fought with breast cancer  since 2005. She died on January 18, 2020, after a brief illness at the age of 55.

References

External links
Nevada State Legislature - Senator Allison Copening official government website
Allison Copening for State Senator official campaign website
Project Vote Smart - Senator Allison Copening (NV) profile
Follow the Money - Allison Copening
2008 campaign contributions

1964 births
2020 deaths
Democratic Party Nevada state senators
Politicians from Las Vegas
Women state legislators in Nevada
University of Nevada, Las Vegas alumni
21st-century American women